Kurt Niederstätter (born 3 August 1976) is an Italian snowboarder. He competed in the men's parallel giant slalom event at the 2002 Winter Olympics.

References

External links
 

1976 births
Living people
Italian male snowboarders
Olympic snowboarders of Italy
Snowboarders at the 2002 Winter Olympics
Sportspeople from Brixen
21st-century Italian people